Nature's Best Photography is a magazine based in Reston, Virginia. Its primary focus is to inspire greater understanding and stewardship of nature through the art of photography.

History and profile
Launched as an annual publication in 1995 by current editor-in-chief and publisher Stephen B. Freligh, Nature's Best Photography is published semi-annually on high-quality glossy oversized paper.

In 1996, the Nature's Best International Photography Awards (now the Nature's Best Photography Windland Smith Rice International Photography Awards) was created as an annual competition to recognize outstanding nature photography and foster the efforts of photographers worldwide, as well as further conservation awareness. Past winners and honorees of the competition include Rodney Lough Jr., Jeremy Woodhouse, Fritz Pölking, Kevin Schafer, Howard G. Buffett and Thorsten Milse. Today, the competition has grown to be recognized as one of the world's most respected photo competitions. Select competition winners' photographs are exhibited annually at the Smithsonian National Museum of Natural History in Washington, D.C.

References

External links
 Nature's Best Photography Magazine

Visual arts magazines published in the United States
Annual magazines published in the United States
Biannual magazines published in the United States
Magazines established in 1995
Magazines published in Virginia
Photography magazines
Photography in the United States